is a Japanese sugar syrup. It is similar to molasses, but thinner and milder.

It is typically made from unrefined  (muscovado sugar), and is a central ingredient in many Japanese sweets.

See also
 List of syrups

References

Sources
 
 Taste of Zen: kuromitsu recipe 

Japanese cuisine
Syrup